Wardell Rouse (born June 9, 1972) is a former American football linebacker. He played for the Tampa Bay Buccaneers in 1995.

References

1972 births
Living people
American football linebackers
Clemson Tigers football players
Tampa Bay Buccaneers players